Cervical cancer-associated transcript 37 is a protein that in humans is encoded by the CRAT37 gene.

References

Further reading